The House of Al Falasi is both a name of a tribe and a name of its Al Maktoum branch (ruling family of Dubai).

History
The Al Maktoum family descends from the Al Bu Falasah (now known as Al-Falasi) section of the Bani Yas, a  tribal federation that has been the dominant power throughout most of what is now the United Arab Emirates. In 1833, a large group of the Al Bu Falasah section of the Bani Yas seceded to Dubai during the pearling season, under the leadership of Maktoum bin Butti bin Sohal, escaping the violence of Sheikh Khalifah of Abu Dhabi. Dubai was readily given up to them by its wali. The following autumn, the bulk of their relatives joined them and virtually all of the Al Bu Falasah were domiciled in Dubai from then on.

Sheikh Maktoum bin Hasher Al Maktoum (Ruler from 1894 to 1906) convinced merchants from Lingeh in Iran to stay in the city by assuring zero taxation. A more modern cosmopolitan city as well as a business friendly orientation was later established, which is what Dubai is now known for. By the 1930s, the population of Dubai had nearly reached 20,000, a quarter of whom were expatriates.

In the 1950s,  the Dubai Creek began to silt up. The late Ruler of Dubai,  Sheikh Rashid bin Saeed Al Maktoum, commissioned the dredging of  the waterway; resulting in an increased volume of cargo handling in Dubai, reinforcing Dubai's position as a re-export and trading hub.

Timeline of rulers of Dubai

Members of Al Falasi

 Mohammed bin Rashid Al Maktoum - Ruler of Dubai and leader of the tribe
 Hind bint Maktoum bin Juma Al Maktoum 
 Hamdan bin Mohammed Al Maktoum - Crown Prince of Dubai
 Haya bint Hussein (by marriage) - Princess of Jordan
 Rashid bin Mohammed Al Maktoum - (1981-2015) (Previous Crown Prince - title was removed)
 Maktoum bin Mohammed Al Maktoum - Deputy Ruler of Dubai
 Saeed bin Butti - Ruler of Dubai (1852-1859)
 Obeid bin Said bin Rashid - Ruler of Dubai (1833–36)
 Hushur bin Maktoum- Ruler of Dubai (1859-1886)
 Mani bin Rashid - Ruler of Dubai (1929-1929)
 Rashid bin Saeed Al Maktoum - Ruler of Dubai (1958-1990)
 Maktoum bin Rashid Al Maktoum - Ruler of Dubai, and Vice President of the UAE (1990-2006)
 Butti bin Suhail Al Maktoum - Ruler of Dubai (1906-1912)
 Saeed bin Maktoum bin Hasher Al Maktoum - Ruler of Dubai (1912-1958)
 Maktoum bin Butti bin Suhail - Ruler of Dubai (1833-1852)
 Ahmed bin Saeed Al Maktoum - president of the Department of Civil Aviation, CEO and chairman of The Emirates Group and Chairman of Dubai World
 Lahej Saif Saeed Al Falasi - Chairman of Academy of Technical Training
 Ahmed bin Rashid Al Maktoum -Major General
Ahmad Belhoul Al Falasi - Minister of State for Entrepreneurship and SMEs
 Sultan bin Ahmed bin Sulayem - XChairman, Dubai World
 Mohammad Ali Bin Zayed Al Falasi - Deputy Governor of the UAE Central Bank
 Maitha bint Mohammed bin Rashid Al Maktoum - Olympic Athlete in Karate and Taekwondo 
 Manal bint Mohammed bin Rashid Al Maktoum - Emirati Politician 
 Latifa bint Mohammed Al Maktoum (II)
 Majid bin Mohammed bin Rashid Al Maktoum - Philanthropist 
 Mohammad bin Abdallah Al Gaz - Former Chairman of the UAE Central Bank (1930-2016)
 Jamal Mohammed Al Hai - Executive Senior Vice President of Dubai International Airport, UAE parliament member.
 Saeed bin Maktoum bin Rashid Al Maktoum - Olympic Athlete

Family tree

Coat of arms 
The coats of arms of the House of Al Falasi is simply described as إمارة دبي, i.e., Emirate of Dubai which is represented by a Falcon (The National bird of the UAE).

References 

Middle Eastern royal families
Arab dynasties
Al-Falasi
Tribes of the United Arab Emirates